Henry Parsons may refer to:

 Henry Parsons (Massachusetts politician) (fl. 1897–1909), mayor of Marlborough, Massachusetts
 Henry Parsons (English politician) (1687–1739), MP for Lostwithiel and Maldon